Hybridization (or hybridisation) may refer to:

Hybridization (biology), the process of combining different varieties of organisms to create  a hybrid
Orbital hybridization, in chemistry, the mixing of atomic orbitals into new hybrid orbitals
Nucleic acid hybridization, the process of joining two complementary strands of nucleic acids - RNA, DNA or oligonucleotides
In evolutionary algorithms, the merging two or more optimization techniques into a single algorithm
Memetic algorithm, a common template for hybridization
In linguistics, the process of one variety blending with another variety
The alteration of a vehicle into a hybrid electric vehicle
In globalization theory, the ongoing blending of cultures
Hybridization in political election campaign communication, the combining of campaign techniques developed in different countries
In paleoanthropology, the hypothesis of Neanderthal and human hybridization

See also
Hybrid (disambiguation)
Hybridity